Daniel "Dan" Willcox (born 8 June 1990) is a New Zealand sailor.

Willcox was born in 1990 in Takapuna on Auckland's North Shore. His father, Hamish Willcox, was a professional sailor who competed in the America's Cup and his sister, Anna Willcox-Silfverberg, competed at the 2014 Winter Olympics in freestyle skiing.

He was a competitor in the 2016 470 World Championships in San Isidro, Buenos Aires where he won a silver medal. Willcox competed at the 2016 Rio Summer Olympics in the Men's 470 alongside Paul Snow-Hansen; they finished in tenth place.

References

External links
 
 
 
 

1990 births
Living people
New Zealand male sailors (sport)
Sailors at the 2016 Summer Olympics – 470
Olympic sailors of New Zealand
Sportspeople from Auckland
People from Takapuna
Sailors at the 2020 Summer Olympics – 470